A Pell Grant is a subsidy the U.S. federal government provides for students who need it to pay for college. Federal Pell Grants are limited to students with financial need, who have not earned their first bachelor's degree, or who are enrolled in certain post-baccalaureate programs, through participating institutions. Originally known as a Basic Educational Opportunity Grant, it was renamed in 1980 in honor of Democratic U.S. Senator Claiborne Pell of Rhode Island. A Pell Grant is generally considered the foundation of a student's financial aid package, to which other forms of aid are added. The Federal Pell Grant program is administered by the United States Department of Education, which determines the student's financial need and through it, the student's Pell eligibility. The U.S. Department of Education uses a standard formula to evaluate financial information reported on the Free Application for Federal Student Aid (FAFSA) for determining the student's Expected Family Contribution (EFC).

Pell Grants were created by the Higher Education Act of 1965. These federal funded grants are not like loans, and need not be repaid. Students may use their grants at any one of approximately 5,400 participating postsecondary institutions. These federally funded grants help about 5.4 million full-time and part-time college and vocational school students nationally. As of the 2017–2018 academic year, three of the top ten colleges by total Pell Grant money awarded were for-profit colleges, the largest of which was the University of Phoenix.

In August 2022, President Joe Biden announced that up to $20,000 of debt would be canceled for Pell Grant recipients.

History

Today, the Pell Grant program assists undergraduates of low-income families, who are actively attending universities and or other secondary institutions. However, before the Pell Grant became what it is today, it went through numerous changes.

In 1965, Congress passed the Higher Education Act of 1965 (HEA). President Lyndon B. Johnson implemented the HEA as a part of his administration's agenda to assist and improve higher education in the United States. It was the initial legislation to benefit lower- and middle-income students. The HEA program included not only grants but also low-interest loans to students who did not qualify for grants. Universities and other institutions, such as vocational schools, benefited as well from the HEA program, by receiving federal aid to improve the quality of the education process. Student aid programs administered by the US Department of Education are contained in Title IV of the HEA and so are called "Title IV Programs."

In 1972, Title IX Higher Education Amendments were a response to the distribution of aid in the current grant. Senator Claiborne Pell set forth the initial movements to reform the HEA. Lois Rice, an American corporate executive, scholar and education policy expert is known as the "mother of the Pell Grant" for her work lobbying for its creation. Opportunity Grant Program (Basic Grant) were intended to serve as the "floor" or "foundation" of an undergraduate student's financial aid package. Other financial aid, to the extent that it was available, would be added to the Basic Grant up to the limit of a student's financial need. Most changes to the federal student aid program result from a process called reauthorization. Through the process of reauthorization, Congress examines the status of each program and decides whether to continue that program and whether a continued program requires changes in structure or purpose. Congress has reauthorized campus-based programs every five or six years, beginning in 1972.

In 1994, Congress passed the Violent Crime Control and Law Enforcement Act (VCCLEA), a provision of which revoked Pell Grant funding "to any individual who is incarcerated in any federal or state penal institution." A provision of this Act overturned a section of the Higher Education Act of 1965, which created the Pell Grant for postsecondary education. The provision reads, "No basic grant shall be awarded under this subpart to any individual who is incarcerated in any Federal or State penal institution." Prisoners first became eligible for basic grant funding in 1972. As the principal design of the Pell Grant was to help low-income individuals attain post-secondary education, including prisoners was consistent with the goal. The grant aimed to reach those who might not otherwise have an opportunity to enroll in college study or vocational training programs. Including prisoners for funding was based on the notion that higher education improved the lives of inmates, reduced recidivism, and contributed to a more orderly institution.

There has been some advocacy for reinstating Pell Grant funding for all prisoners who would qualify, despite their incarceration status, by members of the House of Representatives who introduced the Restoring Education and Learning Act (REAL Act) in the spring of 2014. At the executive level, the Obama Administration backed a program at the Department of Education that would have allowed for a limited lifting of the ban for some prisoners called the Second Chance Pell Pilot.

The ban was lifted by the Consolidated Appropriations Act, 2021.

Higher Education Amendments of 1972

The Higher Education Amendments of 1972 reauthorized the three campus-based programs, leaving the Economic Opportunity Grant Program with the same name, but renaming the two others: the National Defense Student Loan Program became the National Direct Student Loan or Federal Direct Student Loan Program and the Federal Supplemental Educational Opportunity Grant Program (SEOG). In addition, for-profit schools became eligible to use Title IV Funds. Also, the Educational Opportunity Grant Program was changed to no longer function as a stand-alone program of gift aid but instead was linked with the Basic Grant Program.

In 1978, the Middle Income Student Assistance Act of 1978 (MISAA) was signed into act by President Jimmy Carter. This bill provides more generous Basic Educational Opportunity Grant, Pell Grants to low-income students, and makes students from families with incomes up to about $25,000 eligible. An additional 1.5 million students from middle-income families became eligible for the Basic Grants program.

Education Amendments of 1978
Starting in 1978, families were able to borrow $300 a year for each dependent child in school regardless of income.

Recent legislation
Several changes to the program occurred in 2011. The maximum award amount for the 2011–2012 award year is $5,500. Despite a shortened application process, fewer funds for the 2011–2012 program could lead to financial problems for many students. The government funded the program at $17.1 billion from 2008 to 2010, as part of the American Recovery and Reinvestment Act of 2009. However, the additional funding does not match the needs of increasing numbers of students who enroll in college and qualify for aid through the recession. The Pell Grant program was subject to a $5.7 billion decrease in funding as part of a continuing resolution (H.R. 1), which cleared the House in February 2011 and cut about $60 billion from the federal budget. The changes would take effect for the 2011–2012 school year, decreasing the maximum amount of aid for the most needy students from $5,550 to $4,705 a year; in addition, about 1.7 million students who receive smaller Pell Grants would become ineligible for the program. As of April 6, 2011, funds have not been approved, as the Senate has not voted to pass this legislation.

Application

The application process requires the student and the student's family complete a Free Application for Federal Student Aid (FAFSA) form. The applicant should complete the FAFSA form for the first time prior to starting the freshman undergraduate year and then update the form each year as the applicant progresses through the college undergraduate term. The first step in applying for the Pell Grant is to complete or update the FAFSA form on or after October 1 of each year. If an applicant must correct a completed FAFSA form, it can be done in step 3 of the application, in the "Make corrections to a processed FAFSA" section. When the student completes or updates the FAFSA application, answers to questions determine eligibility for the Pell Grant, among other government grants and funding.

After the initial FAFSA application is submitted, the student is notified by email or regular postal delivery if funding is awarded. Copies of the confirmation sheet should be made for personal records.

Eligibility
The U.S. Department of Education has a standard formula that it uses to evaluate the information that each person supplies when applying for the Pell Grant. The formula used was created by Congress from criteria submitted through the FAFSA form. The formula produces a number that is called the Expected Family Contribution (EFC), which determines the student's eligibility.

This grant requires each applicant to be an undergraduate student who has not yet earned a bachelor's degree, and a United States citizen or an eligible non-citizen (usually, a permanent resident). In addition, the applicant must have a high school diploma or a GED or be able to demonstrate the ability to benefit from the program. Applicants must also sign a statement certifying that they will use the aid only for education-related purposes, that they are not currently in default for any federal student loans, and that they owe no refund for any federal education grants.

The Pell Grant also requires that students maintain satisfactory academic progress in a degree-oriented program as defined by the school they attend. A person may be eligible if previously incarcerated but with limited eligibility, depending on the offense.

Students must not have an outstanding Pell overpayment on record. Additionally, an applicant may not receive Pell Grant funds from more than one college at a time.

Award amount
As with all grants, there is a maximum amount that the government funds for each applicant. The maximum amount for the 2022–2023 award year is $6,845. The maximum amount of the grant usually depends on the EFC and several other factors, including cost of attendance, the amount of time the student plans to attend college, whether it is a full academic year, and whether one is a full-time or part-time student. Once one has been considered eligible, the money can be obtained a couple of ways: the student's school can apply Pell Grant funds to school costs, pay the student directly, usually by check, or combine these methods.

The school must tell the student in writing how much the award will be and how and when it will be paid, and it must disburse Pell Grant funds once a semester/term or twice during the academic year. Under certain circumstances, Pell funds can also be used to fund Career Pathways programs and support services.

Uses of grant
Typically, the college first applies the grant or loan money toward a student's tuition, fees, and (if the student lives on campus) room and board. Any money left over is paid to the student for other expenses: books, living expenses if the student does not live on campus, and transportation.

Impact
Students coming from low-income families already face increased challenges that hinder their ability to receive a higher education. The Pell Grant addresses one of the issues by making college accessible to students that may need the financial assistance. It has been shown to increase the college enrollment of students coming from lower and moderate-income families. It can also reduce the chances of them dropping out.

There have been advocacy efforts to reinstate prisoner eligibility for Pell grants as a preventative to re-incarceration. In 1997, one study on 3,200 prisoners in three states showed that receiving education while incarcerated reduced  the likelihood  of re-incarceration by 29 percent.

Lynn Novick, the director of "College Behind Bars" and a collaborator with Ken
Burns, recently wrote in the Seattle Times about how access to college education
in prison was markedly reduced:

"Higher education in prison was commonplace in America until 1994, when the
Clinton Crime Bill banned federal Pell Grants for people in prison. Overnight,
college behind bars was decimated. Privately funded programs like the one we
visited, the Bard Prison Initiative (BPI), slowly sprang up, but they do not
begin to fill the enormous need."

She argues that access to education may help reduce the high recidivism rates of
50-60% and reports that "Of the 600 BPI alumni who have been released in the
past 20 years, only 4% have gone back to prison."

Appropriations

Fiscal Year 2011: $41,674,180,000
Fiscal Year 2010: $21,772,000,000
Fiscal Year 2009 : $19,378,000,000
Fiscal Year 2008 : $16,256,000,000
Fiscal Year 2007 : $13,660,711,000
Note: The amount for FY 2006 includes $4.3 billion to retire prior-year funding shortfalls; the amount for FY 2008 includes $2 billion in mandatory funds.

Note: The amounts for FY 2008 and FY 2009 include $2,000,000,000 and $2,100,000,000, respectively, in mandatory funds. In addition, the $17,114,000,000 in 70 U .S. Department of Education Recovery Act funds includes $1,474,000,000 in mandatory funds, of which 831,000,000 is for use in academic year 2010–11.

Note: The amount for FY 2009 includes $2,090,000,000 in definite mandatory funds and $16,283,000,000 in American Recovery and Reinvestment Act of 2009 funds, of which $643,000,000 is mandatory. The FY 2010 appropriation amount includes $5,299,816,000 in indefinite mandatory funds. The FY 2011 appropriation above includes $13,500,000,000 in mandatory funds to help reduce discretionary need and $5,218,184,000, which is the estimate of indefinite mandatory funds needed.

Awards information 
 2011

Amount of Aid Available: $35,772,935,000
Amount of Aid Available represents the amount of funds to be awarded to participants in this program.
Number of New Awards Anticipated: 9,413,000
Average New Award: $3,800
Range of New Awards: $555–$5,550

 2010

Amount of Aid Available: $32,295,226,000
Amount of Aid Available represents the amount of funds to be awarded to participants in this program.
Number of New Awards Anticipated: 8,355,000
Average New Award: $3,865
Range of New Awards: $555–$5,550

 2009

Amount of Aid Available: $25,328,889,000
Amount of Aid Available represents the amount of funds awarded to participants in the Federal Student Aid programs. Depending upon the program, this total may include federal appropriated dollars, institutional or state matching dollars, and federal or private loan capital.
Number of New Awards Anticipated: 7,022,000
Average New Award: $3,611
Range of New Awards: $486–$5,350

 2008

Amount of Aid Available: $16,428,110,000
Amount of Aid Available represents the amount of funds awarded to participants in the Federal Student Aid programs. Depending upon the program, this total may include federal appropriated dollars, institutional or state matching dollars, and federal or private loan capital.
Number of New Awards Anticipated: 5,578,000
Average New Award: $2,945
Range of New Awards: $400–$4,731

 2007

Amount of Aid Available: $13,989,305,000
Amount of Aid Available represents the amount of funds awarded to participants in the Federal Student Aid programs. Depending upon the program, this total may include federal appropriated dollars, institutional or state matching dollars, and federal or private loan capital.
Number of New Awards Anticipated: 5,339,000
Average New Award: $2,620
Range of New Awards: $400–$4,310

Federal Pell Grant lifetime eligibility calculator

The scheduled award is the maximum amount of Federal Pell Grant funding a student can receive is calculated for an award year. An award year is a period from July 1 of one calendar year to June 30 of the next year.

The scheduled award is partially determined using the student's expected family contribution (EFC), which the program calculates from the information the student and family provided in the Free Application for Federal Student Aid (FAFSA). The result is the maximum amount the student can receive for the award year if enrolled full-time for the full school year. It represents 100% of the Pell Grant eligibility for that award year.

To determine how much of the maximum six years (600%) of Pell Grant the student uses each year, the U.S. Department of Education (ED) compares the actual amount awarded for the award year with the scheduled award amount for that award year. A student who uses 100% receives the full award. A student might not receive the entire scheduled award for an award year, most commonly if the student did not enroll for the full year, did not enroll full-time, or both. If the student does not receive the full award, ED calculates the percentage of the scheduled award they received. Before the 2011-2012 Aid Year, the FAFSA limit was 18 semesters, but it was cut to 12 semesters by Congress.

ED tracks the Lifetime Eligibility Used by adding the percentages of the Pell Grant scheduled awards a student receives each award year.

See also
Student financial aid in the United States

References

External links
FAFSA on the Web
'The Mass Production of Credentials: Subsidies and the Rise of the Higher Education Industry.' "The Independent Review" 15 (3): 325–349
ed.gov
studentaid.ed.gov
Pell Grant Fraud Awareness: White-Collar Crime Challenges FBI

Student financial aid in the United States
Federal assistance in the United States
Liberalism in the United States
Subsidies
United States Department of Education
Grants (money)